Cindy Busby (born March 18, 1983) is a Canadian actress. She portrayed Ashley Stanton on Heartland, and has played many roles in Hallmark movies, including Marrying Mr. Darcy, Follow Me to Daisy Hills, and Warming Up to You.

Early life
Born and raised in Montreal, Quebec, Busby always dreamed of becoming an actress. From the time she was a child, she loved performing for an audience and throughout her elementary school and high school years, she devoted herself to every theater school production. Upon graduating from high school, Busby was accepted into the Professional Theater Program at Dawson College in Montreal and was admitted from among hundreds of applicants.

Career
Starting out in theater in 2005, she crossed into television and film and was given her first lead in the story of the Canadian medical hero Norman Bethune in the television series Bethune, which filmed in rural China for two and a half months and attracted several million viewers. In 2006, Busby played a supporting lead in the Lifetime original film A Life Interrupted opposite Lea Thompson and also landed a series regular role on the series Heartland when she was cast as Ashley Stanton, a rich, self-righteous, competitive horseback rider. The series has been nominated for several Gemini Awards as well as winning a Directors Guild of Canada prize and became one of the most popular shows on Canadian television.

In 2008 and 2009, Busby first landed the lead antagonist in the film Picture This alongside Ashley Tisdale, Shenae Grimes, and Kevin Pollak and appeared on the hit CW series The Vampire Diaries. In 2011, she appeared on the big screen in Fox 2000 Pictures' The Big Year, in which she was seen opposite Steve Martin, Jack Black, and Owen Wilson.

In 2012, Busby filmed guest starring roles on the CW shows Supernatural, The L.A. Complex, and The Secret Circle. She was also seen as a lead in the SyFy movie of the week, Mega Cyclone, and more recently, was seen in 12 Rounds 2: Reloaded as the wife of WWE wrestler Randy Orton, in The Wedding Chapel playing a young Shelley Long, and in Hallmark Channel's Lucky in Love opposite Jessica Szhor.

Busby has been seen guest starring on USA's Rush, TNT's Proof and recurred on Hallmark Channel's Debbie Macomber's Cedar Cove. She starred in the independent films The Circle and 40 Below and Falling and was cast as the lead in A Puppy for Christmas. She also appeared in the Hallmark Movies & Mysteries original, Hailey Dean Mystery: Murder, With Love.

Personal life
In December 2020, Busby married producer Chris Boyd after four years of dating.

Filmography

Films

Television

Web

References

External links
 
 

1983 births
21st-century Canadian actresses
Actresses from Montreal
Anglophone Quebec people
Canadian film actresses
Canadian television actresses
Living people